Evelyn Buckwar is a German mathematician specializing in stochastic differential equations. She is Professor for Stochastics at the Johannes Kepler University Linz in Austria.

Education
Buckwar earned a diploma in mathematics in 1992 from the Free University of Berlin, and completed her doctorate there in 1997. Her dissertation, Iterative Approximation of the Positive Solutions of a Class of Nonlinear Volterra-type Integral Equations, was supervised by Rudolf Gorenflo.

Career
After working as a Marie Curie Fellow at the University of Manchester and then as a researcher at the Humboldt University of Berlin, where she completed a habilitation in 2005, she became a visiting professor at Otto von Guericke University Magdeburg and the Technical University of Berlin before becoming a lecturer at Heriot-Watt University in 2007. She took her present position at the Johannes Kepler University Linz in 2011.

References

External links

Year of birth missing (living people)
Living people
Austrian mathematicians
Austrian women scientists
20th-century German mathematicians
German women mathematicians
Free University of Berlin alumni
Academics of Heriot-Watt University
Academic staff of Johannes Kepler University Linz
20th-century German women